Harold Chapman is a former association football player who represented New Zealand at international level.

Chapman made a single appearance in an official international for the All Whites in a 1–4 loss to Australia on 18 July 1936.

References 

Year of birth missing (living people)
Living people
New Zealand association footballers
New Zealand international footballers
Association footballers not categorized by position